Deer Lake is a small lake located east-northeast of Long Eddy in Delaware County, New York. Deer Lake drains south via an unnamed creek that flows into East Branch Basket Creek.

See also
 List of lakes in New York

References 

Lakes of New York (state)
Lakes of Delaware County, New York